Tavan or Tovan may refer to:

Tavan, Qazvin
Tavan, West Azerbaijan
Alphonse Tavan (1833-1905), French Provençal poet

See also
 Tavan Dasht (disambiguation)